Richard Tracey (1943–2020) is a British politician

Richard Tracey or Richard Tracy may also refer to:

Richard Tracey (footballer) (born 1979), English footballer
Richard Tracey (judge) (1948–2019), Australian judge and military officer
Richard Tracey (Royal Navy officer) (1837–1907), British naval officer
Richard Tracy (died 1569), English lay Protestant reformer and Member of Parliament